Charles Winkler is an American television and film director and producer. He is the son of Academy Award-winning producer and director Irwin Winkler and actress Margo Winkler. He was married to actress Sandra Nelson from 1998 until their divorce in 2012.

Partial filmography as director
You Talkin' to Me? (1987)
Disturbed (1990)
Red Ribbon Blues (1996)
Rocky Marciano (1999)
At Any Cost (2000)
Shackles (2005)
The Net 2.0 (2006)
Streets of Blood (2009)

References

External links

American film directors
American film producers
American television directors
Living people
Place of birth missing (living people)
Year of birth missing (living people)